The Winsum train disaster took place on 25 July 1980 near Winsum in the Dutch province of Groningen. 9 people died and 21 were injured. 

The accident took place on a single track between Sauwerd and Roodeschool that did not have ATB or signals, instead the drivers were informed by radio where other trains on the tracks were, which was a less reliable system that relied on trust.

In the foggy early morning of 25 July 1980 the driver of commuter train 8726 departed from Winsum railway station. Because of the fog he could not see the other train (8713) coming from Sauwerd, which the traffic controllers had warned him about and they told him to wait departing from Winsum until it had passed. Both trains collided head on.

The true cause of the disaster never became clear.

References

Train collisions in the Netherlands
Railway accidents in 1980
1980 in the Netherlands
Railway accidents involving fog
Accidents and incidents involving Nederlandse Spoorwegen
Het Hogeland
1980 disasters in the Netherlands